The Kameng River (previously named Bharali River, now called Kameng in Arunachal Pradesh and Jiabharali (Jia Bharali) in Assam) in the eastern Himalayan mountains, originates in Tawang district from the glacial lake below snow-capped Gori Chen mountain , elevation , on the India-Tibet border and flows through Bhalukpong circle of West Kameng District,  Arunachal Pradesh and Sonitpur District of Assam, India. It becomes a braided river in its lower reaches and is one of the major tributaries of the Brahmaputra River, joining it at Tezpur, just east  of the Kolia Bhomora Setu bridge.

Its drainage basin is about  large.

The Kameng forms the boundary between East Kamemg District and West Kameng Districts  and is also the boundary between the Sessa and Eaglenest sanctuaries to its west and the Pakke tiger reserve to the east.  The Dafla Hills are east and the Aka Hills (home of Aka tribe) are west of the Kameng River. The entire stretch of forest along the  Bhalukpong–Bomdila highway on the west bank of the river in West Kameng has vanished in the last few years though the forest across the river continues to be in a healthy state.

History
The Kameng river had an important historical significance. During the medieval period i.e. between 13th to early 16th century, it marked the borders  between the Chutiya kingdom and the Kamata kingdom. Later, in the 16th century, after the annexation of the Chutiya kingdom by the Ahoms and the downfall of Kamata kingdom, it acted as the border between the Ahom kingdom and Baro-Bhuyan rule.

Tributaries
The eastern half of Eaglenest-Sessa Wildlife sanctuaries is drained by the Tippi Naala (Tippi River) which joins Kameng River at the village of Tippi on the Bhalukpong-Bomdila Highway. The other major rivers flowing through West Kameng District, the Tenga, Bichom and Dirang Chu, are tributaries of the Kameng.

Maps

See also 

 Nyegyi Kansang

Notes

External links
 
Kameng River on Wikimapia
 Photo of Gorichen Peak

Rivers of Arunachal Pradesh
Rivers of Assam
Rivers of India